The Entrepreneurship Cell, IIT Bombay, also known as E-Cell, IIT Bombay, is the primary entrepreneurship promoting body of the Indian Institute of Technology Bombay, managed and run completely by the students of the institute. It organizes initiatives like the annual business plan competition Eureka! and the flagship event, The Entrepreneurship Summit (E-Summit) in January each year, which receives a footfall of over 30,000 people who include students, investors, corporates, mentors, celebrities and the most important; Entrepreneurs.

Vision 
The Entrepreneurship Cell, IIT Bombay targets to help in the development of India's entrepreneurial ecosystem by enabling easy and efficient interaction between its major components spanning students, working professionals, aspiring and existing entrepreneurs, mentors, angel investors, venture capital firms and corporates through events like interactive sessions, competitions and conferences.

History 
In October 1998, The Entrepreneurship Cell was formed by the students of IIT  Bombay with the mission of promoting the culture of entrepreneurship within the campus of IIT Bombay. E-Cell IIT Bombay was one of the founding members of the National Entrepreneurship Network.

In 1999, 'Right Half', the first campus startup of IIT Bombay and any engineering institute in India was founded by Kashyap Deorah (B.Tech, CSE, Batch of 2000) along with two of his batchmates in their final year.

In 2000, business incubator SINE was inaugurated by Mr. Nandan Nilekani (Founder & Ex-CEO, Infosys) and Mr. Kanwal Rekhi (Venture Capitalist & Director, TiE). The incubator jump starts with 8 startups in the year.

In 2001, Eureka!, E-Cell’s B-Model competition was recognized as ‘Asia’s largest Business Model Competition’ by CNN.

In 2005, E-Cell was recognized as the Leading Entrepreneurship Promoting Student Organization in the country by the ‘NEN Achievement Awards’ and felicitated at TiECon 2005.

In 2008, E-Cell, IIT Bombay represented India and the Indian sub-continent at the `Global Conference of E-Cells’ organized by Massachusetts Institute of Technology at Madrid, Spain in April 2008.

In 2010, THOMSON REUTERS declares Eureka! as “Asia’s Largest Business Model Competition”. 1985 batch of IIT-B decides to support Eureka.

In 2011, E-Cell officially collaborated with E-Bootcamp organized by BASES (Business Association of Stanford Entrepreneurial Students), Stanford University for Eureka!

In 2012, E-Cell, IIT-Bombay collaborated with Harvard US-India Initiative (HUH) to conduct an international conference on Entrepreneurship and Innovation. E-Summit witnessed huge participation from youth across India.

In 2013, E-Summit became the 1st entrepreneurship promoting event to conferred with UNESCO patronage. E-Cell spearheaded the formation of Entrepreneurship Centre of the Institute which was launched at E-Summit 2014. National Entrepreneurship Challenge initiated by E-Cell IITB reaches out to 150 colleges, leading to the creation of more than 50 E-Cells in the country.

In 2014, the first edition of The Ten Minute Million Challenge (TTMM) was held. The competition provided on-spot funding to its participants. The first edition was a huge success with 6 out of 10 participants receiving funding from investors.

In 2015, FCoF, a platform to connect startups to freelancers and their potential co-founders was launched. Alongside, Startup Services Platform (SSP) was launched to provide legal and financial consultancies to startups at minimal rates. E-Summit was provided patronage from GoI's flagship initiative Make in India. E-Summit saw the edition of two new events, Business Conclave and Innovation Conclave.

In 2016, E-Cell IITB launched Enlighten, an initiative that provided all the relevant information regarding entrepreneurship. Eureka! received 8884 entries, highest since its inception.

In 2017, Swacch and EnTech were initiated. Swacch was a social campaign that encouraged the people of Mumbai to keep the public spaces clean. EnTech envisioned to support and increase the technology startups from IIT Bombay.

In 2018, Pre-Summit, an initiative aimed at promoting the E-Summit was launched. Pre-Summit reached out to a large number of people and turned out to be a huge success. Alongside, the face of E-Cell, consisting of its logo design was completely revamped, celebrating 20 years of E-Cell.

In 2019, E-Summit was showcased on the Nasdaq Tower, Times Square for the first time ever. E-Summit also saw the addition of three new events, RnD Conclave and Content Creation Conclave and Seed Stars.

In 2020, E-Summit is taken completely online in order to adapt with the pandemic, received huge attention from the media with coverage from networks like ETNow, Mirror Now, Business Insider and The Hindu.

The Entrepreneurship Summit 
The Entrepreneurship Summit is the annual flagship event of E-Cell IIT Bombay, which is a confluence of visionary students, professionals or anybody who has a vision to leave a dent in the universe, start his own business or fund a business and become a trendsetter. This grand event gives a chance for people to interact and help build successful ventures. The summit also showcases the latest global trends in entrepreneurship. Held on 5 and 6 February 2022, with the theme of “A Trailblazing Realm”, the E-Summit witnessed speaker sessions from  Vijay Shekhar Sharma, Byju Raveendran, Kunal Shah, Aman Gupta and others. The event was held in a hybrid mode, where a few events like The Ten Minute Million and Networking Arena were conducted offline and others were held online using a platform created by our own team.

E-Summit in the past has been a host to personalities like Ritesh Agarwal, Travis Kalanick, Indra Nooyi, Bhavish Aggarwal, Arundhati Bhattacharya, Divyank Turakhia, Amitabh Kant, Mr. Kanwal Rekhi, Muhammad Yunus, Nandan Nilekani, Tulsi Tanti, Adi Godrej, S Ramadorai, Ronnie Screwvala, Subhash Chandra, Kishore Biyani, Ajit Balakrishnan, Jim Beach amongst others.

E-Summit is a unique student initiative that facilitates the interaction between students, industry experts, business leaders, investors, and entrepreneurs who share the common zeal to stand out of the league. Showcases the global trends in entrepreneurship and how the Indian ecosystem is keeping pace with these trends. Serves as a one-stop destination to learn and apply the skills needed to be an entrepreneur. Provides a meet-up point for the youth to interact with their role models and learn from their experiences. Acts as a catalyst in introducing students to the world of entrepreneurship by providing them with the opportunity to learn in a myriad of ways that include competitions, panel discussions, workshops, etc.

E-Summit facilitates the interaction between students, industry experts, business leaders, investors, and entrepreneurs who share the common zeal to stand out of the league.

Eureka! 
Eureka! is the international Business Plan competition of IIT Bombay organized by the Entrepreneurship Cell. The first edition of Eureka! was launched in 1999. It is regarded as Asia's largest B-plan competition by CNN and Thomson Reuters. It holds the honour of having been able to inspire B plan competitions across India and elsewhere. The format of Eureka! includes one-to-one mentoring and a transparent judging process. It's a 5-month-long educational experience, designed to emulate the process of raising funds for one's startup, covering all the aspects right from writing a business plan to pitching it before an investor. There are several tracks in Eureka!, each with a different purpose, which run parallel to each other.

Eureka! 2021 introduced a new initiative of zonals, where the Indian region was divided into 6 zones and entries were taken from each zone to increase the number of startups benefiting from the mentoring sessions and workshops. Offline Zonals Mentors Meetup were conducted in 3 cities - Mumbai, Bangalore, Delhi.

Eureka! GCC 
This year for the first time ever Eureka! expanded its reach in the GCC region. E-Cell conducted a Business Model competition based on Eureka!’s structure, in partnership with Gulf Islamic Investments, where the competition received over 130 registrations. These startups were provided expert mentors from the gulf region for a month long mentoring round. The finals of Eureka! GCC were conducted in the Indian Pavilion at the EXPO 2020. The event was graced by various notable guests from various investment firms, including [Razia] consultant to the Royal Family. Along with the Eureka! GCC finals, Eureka! Winners were also given a chance to pitch their startup ideas in the front of this esteemed jury.

The Ten Minute Million (TTMM) 
The Ten Minute Million is an on spot funding event where startups pitch idea to a panel of 20+ esteemed investors and get a chance to secure funding of 2.4 million in just 10 minutes! The event was started in 2014 and is organised each year during the E-Summit ever since. It has been covered by NDTV Prime(TV), Economic Times (Newspaper), Financial Chronicle (Newspaper) among notable media coverage in the past editions.

National Entrepreneurship Challenge 
The National Entrepreneurship Challenge was launched in July, 2013 to help colleges across India establish their own Entrepreneurship Cell. The competition is designed and structured so as to help the participants step by step which would ultimately lead to formulation of their own E-Cell. The participants have to do a series of tasks to spread entrepreneurial awareness and help the startups in their campus.

Eureka! Junior 
Eureka! Junior is a competition for those inquisitive minds who try to solve problems in the most innovative way. Aimed to bring out the entrepreneur in children at an early stage, it is a 5-month long educational experience, starting off with a workshop, followed by mentoring; covering everything from writing a business plan to pitching it before an investor in the final competition at the Entrepreneurship Summit. Scaling up to a whopping total of 30k entries from a mere 2.5k entries last year(2020), from students across India, Eureka! Junior proceeded to be a major success in 2021.

Freelancer, Intern and Co-Founders Platform (FInCoF) 
The Freelancers, Intern and Co-Founders platform is an online portal for startups from all over the world to hire freelancers, interns or even co-founders from IIT Bombay. It is free to register and open to all companies and startups from all over the world.

Panel Discussions 
Panel discussion on latest topics like silicon valley and Indian ecosystem, social entrepreneurship, job v/s entrepreneurship and latest trends in entrepreneurship take place.

Startup Expo 
Startup expo invites most innovative startups from across the country. The startups reach out to thousands of its potential customers and network with potential investors. It gives the attendees an opportunity to learn form the success stories of these enterprises.

Mentor's Meet 
The semi-finalists receive extensive support to improve their B-plans. Each team submits its initial draft of their B-plan online which is then assigned a mentor, specific to its field, to help them formalize the final business plan. Taking the mentoring process one step further, a workshop as well as a meeting with a panel of distinguished mentors consisting of investors, venture capitalists and experts in various fields is held in December and semi-finalists are given mentoring on Finance, Marketing, Business Plan and Pitching.

Workshops 
 Pre-Eureka Workshop- The extensive B-Plan making workshop held every year in August and September.
 Venture IOT workshop - 2 day workshop to help entrepreneurs and innovators learn the concepts of IOT to apply in real world
 Fast Track Course on Entrepreneurship which covers Basics of Entrepreneurship, Idea generation, Business Modelling, Marketing, Finance, Funding & Pitching
 Webpreneurship - a 2-day workshop to teach the ways of utilising the web a s an entrepreneurship platform
 EnVoyage - a series of free Workshops is held across various cities of India during December and January. In the workshops the attendees are made aware about entrepreneurship by the means of speaker sessions and interactive games.
 Lean Entrepreneurship Workshop - workshop on Lean Startup

Competitions 
 I_Hack - a 48-hour hackathon organised during the E-Summit where developers create a product prototype for cash prizes and incubation opportunities.
 IPL Auction - a Strategy bidding competition on Cricket Player in which participants build a Squad of players with the highest rating.
 Get set Pitch - A On-spot Pitching event in which participants pitch in front of investors and audience in turn Audience make a portfolio of ideas pitched.
 Bid and Build - A On-spot bidding competition where participants form a team of board members which will best suit the given problem statement.
 Boardroom - A competition which puts the participants in the shoes of board members and present their opinions on a given problem statement.
 Money Heist - A competition where the participants are given a certain amount of resources, and are required to take decisions on various situations and maximize resources.
 Ace the case - A case study based competition where the participants have to analyse and provide solutions to the case study given to them.

Entrepreneurship and Business Club (EnB Club, IITB) 
The Entrepreneurship and Business Club (EnB Club) is a community where innovative ideas are born and nurtured into successful business ventures. EnB Club seeks to take on the myriad challenges that the new economy is facing and translate them into opportunities that can be commercialized while keeping it all simple, fun and engaging. In this way, EnB Club tries to inculcate entrepreneurial spirit in students.

Speaker Sessions 
Several Talks are conducted round the year spanning different sectors from basic to advance. Sessions on introduction to entrepreneurship, school to startup, social media marketing, idea generation, e-commerce, common mistakes the startups make, funding for startups, legal and Intellectual Property issues are some specifics amongst others.

Competitions 
 Wolf of Wall Street -The event held for freshmen aims at making participants aware about the working of Stock Market by hands on activities.
 EnB Buzz - An business idea competition conducted for freshmen
 Competencia de Pitcheo - Instant Problem-Solving cum Business Model Competition aimed at the IITB community.

Startup Bootcamp
The Startup Bootcamp is a 10-week-long program, during which ideas are made startup worthy with the help of an efficient team building exercise as well as extensive mentoring. The selected startups are also offered incubation in SINE (Society for Innovation and Entrepreneurship), IIT Bombay

Enspace 
Enspace is the biannual entrepreneurship magazine of IIT Bombay. It enjoys a huge readership in the campus. Enspace contains stories of successful startups from IITs and beyond. It also features several news items on trends and latest techniques. The Enspace blog keeps the student community connected with the startup ecosystem. The vision of EnSpace is to increase awareness about entrepreneurship in the youth of India by directly reaching out to them. It targets to instigate a desire for lateral thinking and to take the initiative by serving the readers stories that they best can connect with. It contains interviews with leading entrepreneurs and stories of successful entrepreneurial ventures.

Initiatives

Desai Sethi School for Entrepreneurship
IIT Bombay established an Entrepreneurship Centre at its premises, with a generous funding received from Mr. Bharat Desai and Ms. Neerja Sethi, under the aegis of The Desai Sethi Family Foundation. Initially named as Desai Sethi Centre for Entrepreneurship, it fosters entrepreneurship and technology innovation through relevant courses, laboratories and partnerships. Students in the programme receive instruction and mentorship from IIT Bombay faculty as well as distinguished guest faculty from leading international institutions and industry. The establishment of the Centre was announced by the Director of IIT Bombay during the inaugural session of Entrepreneurship Summit (E-Summit 2014), which was organized by the Entrepreneurship Cell of the Institute on 1–2 February 2014. Five years later, in December 2019, the Centre was renamed as Desai Sethi School for Entrepreneurship.

Deferred Placement Policy
With the start-up ecosystem of the institute flourishing and students being keener on taking up entrepreneurial challenges, the Placement Cell has played its part by announcing the introduction of the DPP(Deferred Placement Policy). This policy aims to encourage students who're looking to work on their own start-up idea by safeguarding them against the risk of having to forgo campus placements. According to this initiative, students interested in pursuing an entrepreneurial activity would be given an option to defer their placements by 2 years. The need for a DPP(Deferred Placement Policy) was envisaged due to the current trend of rising interest in entrepreneurship, partly owing to the success of The Entrepreneurship Cell's efforts in fostering an entrepreneurial culture within and outside the institute.

See also
 Indian Institute of Technology Bombay
 Entrepreneurship

References

 http://www.indianexpress.com/news/iitb-to-help-colleges-set-up-cells-to-train--entrepreneurs/1156588/
 http://www.indianexpress.com/news/iitb-to-launch-startup-bootcamp-students-can-now-translate-business-ideas-into-plans/1154552/
 http://www.indianexpress.com/news/iitbs-eureka-moment-over-100-foreign-entries/1178629/
 
 
 http://www.thehindu.com/todays-paper/tp-features/tp-educationplus/iit-bombay-ecell-to-organise-tedx-on-august-23/article2380410.ece
 http://www.thehindubusinessline.com/industry-and-economy/education/iitbombay-woos-students-with-panindia-entrepreneurship-contest/article5042151.ece
 http://www.sineiitb.org/partners.html
 http://www.indianexpress.com/news/ecell-to-help-budding-entrepreneurs-at-iitbombay/826240/
 http://www.ecell.in/
 http://iitb.ac.in/EntpCentre/ESum2014.htm

External links
 

IIT Bombay
Student organisations in India
Entrepreneurship in India
Organizations established in 1998